Rooney the given name or common first name of the following people:
Rooney Lee (1837–1891), American planter, military general and politician
Rooney Mara (born 1985), American actress
Rooney Massara, (born 1943) British rower and businessman
Rooney Roon, former member of the hip hop group Ultramagnetic MCs
Rooney Sweeney (1858 – after 1885), American baseball player

See also
Rooney (surname)